The following is a timeline of the history of the city of Fayetteville, North Carolina, USA.

Prior to 20th century

 1780 - Methodist Church established.
 1783 - Cross Creek and Campbellton combine to become the town of "Fayetteville."
 1789
 November 21: North Carolina convention ratifies the U.S. Constitution.
 Fayetteville Gazette newspaper begins publication.
 Fayetteville becomes capital of the state of North Carolina; State House built.
 1793 - Fayetteville Independent Light Infantry established.
 1794
 Legislature moves to Raleigh.
 Fayetteville Library Society incorporated.
 1799 - Fayetteville Seminary founded.
 1820 - Population: 3,532.
 1830
 Fayetteville Female Society of Industry established.
 Population: 2,868.
 1831 - May 29: Fire.
 1840 - Population: 4,285.
 1845
 June 6: Fire.
 Fayetteville Library Institute founded.
 1858 - Fayetteville Gas Company established.
 1865 - March 14: Fayetteville occupied by Union Army.
 1871 - Knights of Pythias established.
 1877 - "State normal school for negroes" established.

20th century
 1906 - Thomas Jefferson Powers becomes mayor.
 1906 - Woman's Club of Fayetteville founded.
 1907 - Hannibal Lafayette Godwin becomes U.S. representative for North Carolina's 6th congressional district.
 1910 - Congregation Beth Israel established.
 1915 - Orange Street School and Confederate Women's Home established.
 1918 - U.S. military Camp Bragg established near Fayetteville.
 1921 - Fayetteville YMCA, and Fayetteville Business & Professional Women's Club founded.
 1925
 Mission of M.E. Church established.
 Prince Charles Hotel built.
 1926 - Cumberland County Courthouse built.
 1927 - Carolina Theater built.
 1932 - Public library established.
 1935 - Fayetteville Little Theatre begins operating.
 1939
 National Association for the Advancement of Colored People chapter formed.
 WFNC radio begins broadcasting.
 1941 - Colony Theater opens.
 1945 - Sodder Fire - 'Death' of 5 Children
 1948 - WFLB radio begins broadcasting.
 1951 - U.S. military XVIII Airborne Corps headquartered at nearby Fort Bragg.
 1952 - U.S. military Psychological Warfare Center established at nearby Fort Bragg.
 1953 - High school opens.
 1956 - Fayetteville Symphony Orchestra established.
 1960 - February 10: Fayetteville sit-ins begin during Civil Rights Movement.
 1961 - Industrial Education Center established.
 1969 - Fayetteville State University active.
 1975 - Cross Creek Mall in business.
 1982 - Second Harvest Food Bank of Southeast North Carolina established.
 1986 - Fayetteville Detention Center privatised.
 1987 - David Price becomes U.S. representative for North Carolina's 4th congressional district.
 1988
 Fayetteville Technical Community College active.
 Museum of the Cape Fear Historical Complex established.
 1989
 Cape Fear Botanical Garden established.
 Monarch Stadium (Methodist) opens.

21st century
 2000 - City website online.
 2001 - Marshall Pitts Jr. becomes mayor.
 2005 - Tony Chavonne becomes mayor.
 2010 - Population: 200,564.
 2013 - Nat Robertson becomes mayor.*
 2017 - Mitch Colvin become mayor.*

See also
 Fayetteville history
 List of mayors of Fayetteville, North Carolina
 National Register of Historic Places listings in Cumberland County, North Carolina
 Timelines of other cities in North Carolina: Asheville, Charlotte, Durham, Greensboro, Raleigh, Wilmington, Winston-Salem

References

Bibliography

 
 . + Chronology
 John Oates. The Story of Fayetteville and the Upper Cape Fear (Fayetteville, 1981)

External links

 
 
 

Fayetteville, North Carolina
fayetteville
Fayetteville